Alcis may refer to:
 Alcis (moth), a genus of geometer moths
 Alcis (gods), twin gods worshiped by the Naharvali, a tribe of ancient Germanic peoples
 Alcis, a Macedonia surname or title of the Greek goddess Athena

See also
 Alces (disambiguation)